WNR, or wnr, may refer to:

 WNR, the Amtrak code for Walnut Ridge station in the state of Arkansas, US
 WNR, the IATA code for Windorah Airport in the state of Queensland, Australia
 WNR, the National Rail code for Windsor & Eton Riverside railway station in the county of Berkshire, UK

See also